The Burgan skink (Oligosoma burganae) is a nationally endangered species of skink native to New Zealand. It was described from a specimen found near the Burgan Stream, in the Rock and Pillar Range, Central Otago.

Appearance 
The Burgan skink has a glossy brown colour with a yellow grey abdomen. It has minimal or no scales on the interior edge of its ear opening and usually only three supraocular scales on the crown above the eye. It has a head that is blunter than similar Oligosoma species.

Habitat 
The Burgan skinks preferred habitat are herbs and shrubs above 900 m in the mountainous regions of the Rock and Pillar Ranges as well as in the Lammermoor ranges of Central Otago.

Conservation status 
As of 2012 the Department of Conservation (DOC) classified the Burgan skink as Nationally Endangered under the New Zealand Threat Classification System. A 2012 survey in the Lammermoor and Rock and Pillar Ranges did not reveal any sightings of Burgan skinks. They have since been found in low numbers in a few sites in this area.

References

External links 
 Holotype specimen of Oligosoma burganae held at the Museum of New Zealand Te Papa Tongarewa
 Image of a Burgan skink

Oligosoma
Endangered biota of New Zealand
Reptiles of New Zealand
Reptiles described in 2011
Taxa named by David G. Chapple
Taxa named by Trent Bell
Taxa named by Stephanie N.J. Chapple
Taxa named by Kimberly A. Miller
Taxa named by Charles H. Daugherty
Taxa named by Geoff B. Patterson